Otis Louis Miller (February 2, 1901 – July 26, 1959) was an American politician and baseball player.

Baseball career
Miller was a Major League Baseball third baseman who played for the St. Louis Browns (1927) and Boston Red Sox (1930–1932). Miller batted and threw right-handed. He was born in Belleville, Illinois. In a four-season career, Miller was a .274 hitter (229-for-837) with 95 runs and 91 RBI in 272 games played.

Political career
Miller served in the Illinois House of Representatives from 1949 until his death as a Republican. His son Otis L. Miller, Jr. also served in the Illinois House of Representatives in 1961 and 1962.

Miller died in Belleville, Illinois, at the age of 58.

Notes

External links

Retrosheet

1901 births
1959 deaths
Major League Baseball third basemen
Boston Red Sox players
St. Louis Browns players
Baseball players from Illinois
Sportspeople from Belleville, Illinois
Republican Party members of the Illinois House of Representatives
20th-century American politicians